La Noce de Pierres  (The Wedding Party) is an alignment of 77  standing stones at the foot of Menez Michael in the hills of Brittany.  Aetiological folk tales say that the stones were originally the members of a drunken wedding party, petrified for their mistreatment of a stranger.

The monument was first documented in 1850 by Jean Bachelot La Pylaie, but it was not studied by archaeologists until 1978. It was classified as a monument historique (historic monument) in 1968 and registered in 1980.

References

Buildings and structures in Finistère
Megalithic monuments in Brittany
Tourist attractions in Finistère
Monuments historiques of Finistère

Breton mythology and folklore
French folklore